The 2022 World Triathlon Winter Championships were held in Sant Julià de Lòria, Andorra from February 3 to February 6, 2022.

Medal summary

Medals table

References

External links
 Official website

Winter Championships
World Triathlon Winter Championships
International sports competitions hosted by Andorra
World Triathlon Winter Championships